Kamani may refer to:

Places 
 Pobiti Kamani or Pobitite Kamani, a rock phenomenon in Varna Province, Bulgaria
 Kamani, Bhamo, a village in north-eastern Burma
 Kamani, Iran, a village in Hamadan Province, Iran
 Kamani, Georgia, a village in the disputed region of Abkhazia
 Kamani massacre, 1993, during the Georgian-Abkhaz conflict
 Kamani Monastery
 Kamani, a village in Suriname

People

Surname 
 Kamani (surname)

Given name
 Kamani Batista, American R&B/pop singer
 Kamani Hill,  American professional soccer player
 Kamani (king), Neo-Hittite king of Carchemish

Other uses 
 Kamani Engineering Corporation, an electric power transmission company in India
 Calophyllum inophyllum or kamani, a species of large evergreen

See also
 Kaman (disambiguation)